CI Direct Trading, a division of CI Investment Services Inc., is an online brokerage firm that provides an electronic trading platform to trade financial assets. The company is headquartered in Toronto, Canada and provides trade execution services for various financial instruments such as stocks, bonds, options, exchange-traded fund (ETF) and mutual funds.

Trade orders performed on CI Direct Trading's electronic trading platform are executed by parent company broker-dealer CI Investment Services Inc.

CI Direct Trading's parent company CI Investment Services Inc. is a subsidiary of investment management firm CI Financial.

History

Founded in 2009, CI Direct Trading began as CI Direct Trading before being rebranded in October 2021. CI Direct Trading began as an online trading service enabling trade execution of equities, options, warrants, bonds, debentures, ETFs and mutual funds. It is registered in all provinces and territories of Canada, and is a member of the Investment Industry Regulatory Organization of Canada (IIROC) and the Canadian Investor Protection Fund (CIPF).

In January 2012, CI Direct Trading introduced a new commission structure which enabled retail clients to trade for as low as $0.99 with a cap of $9.99 per trade. This change made CI Direct Trading the leader in low-cost online brokerage. In July, CI Direct Trading began offering trading services on the Canadian National Stock Exchange allowing clients to purchase stocks from the CNSE. In November, CI Direct Trading acquired the Canadian arm of a Chicago based online brokerage firm optionsXpress, acquiring optionsXpress's Canadian client base and expanding CI Direct Trading' size.

In November 2014, CI Direct Trading partnered with London based insurance firm Lloyd's of London offering additional insolvency insurance protection for investors on top of the Canadian Investor Protection Fund (CIPF).

In September 2017, investment management firm CI Financial acquired CI Direct Trading' parent company CI Investment Services Inc.

In December 2018, CI Direct Trading reduced their trade commissions for retail investors to compete with other online brokerage firms. CI Direct Trading reduced their original $9.99 per trade transaction fee to a $0.01 per share fee that caps at $7.99 per trade transaction. In addition, fees for purchases of North American ETFs and mutual funds were reduced to zero.

In January 2019, CI Direct Trading integrated Wealthscope into their online brokerage platform, introducing portfolio analytics enabling clients to monitor and analyze portfolio performance and risk.

In May 2020, parent company CI Financial merged subsidiaries brokerage firm CI Direct Trading and online investing firm WealthBar to create an integrated online investment firm CI Direct Investing.

Disrupting the Industry 
Historically, brokerage commission fees were costly which resulted in the lack of active retail traders. CI Direct Trading became one of the first firms to lower the industry standard of trading commission fees, providing them with the reputation of being Canada's low-cost leader. This exact act resulted as a catalyst for trading commission fees being lowered across the entire brokerage industry from major banks to small independent brokers.

Awards

References

External links
 
CI Investment Services Corporate Website

Financial services companies established in 2009
Companies based in Toronto
Online brokerages
Stock brokerages and investment banks of Canada